Midway Mall is a  square foot regional shopping mall in Elyria, Ohio. Lorain County's only enclosed regional mall, it sits on Ohio State Route 57, about 1/8 mile from Interstate 80 (the Ohio Turnpike) and Interstate 90. Anchored by Dunham's Sports , it is a dead mall with only around 20 stores and services.

History
Midway Mall was originally supposed to open in late August 1966 but was delayed until September 22, 1966. Midway was originally developed by Visconsi Mead Jacob's Company. Original Anchors Higbees  opened August 1, 1966, JCPenney opened September 29, 1966, and  Sears opening in late 1967. In 1995, Best Buy replaced Woolworth, which closed in 1994. Higbee's became Dillard's after being acquired in 1992. The mall was closed for renovation between 1989 and 1990 and reopening in August 1990 with a new May Company Store and a new food court. The May Company store. became Kaufmann's January 31, 1993. Kaufmann's converted to Macy's on September 9, 2006.

The mall was long owned by the Jacobs Group of Cleveland, which sold it as part of a divestment program in 2001 to The Westfield Group, which renamed it Westfield Shoppingtown Midway. In Spring 2006, Westfield announced that the mall did not fulfill their "strategic plan" and sold it in May 2006 to Centro Properties Group, which reverted the name to Midway Mall. Several years later, the mall was managed by The Woodmont Company.

Dillard's closed in 2007, Macy's in 2016, and Sears in 2017. In 2018, Johnny K's Power Sports moved into the former Macy's space. The mall is now owned and managed by Namdar Realty Group.

On February 28, 2019, it was announced that JCPenney would be closing as part of a plan to close 27 stores nationwide. The store closed on July 5, 2019.

On January 6, 2020, it was announced that Best Buy would close when its lease ran out. The store closed on March 7, 2020, leaving Dunham's Sports and Johnny K's Power Sports as the mall's only anchors.

On January 12, 2023, the Lorain County Port Authority voted to buy and develop the mall site.

Anchor Stores 
Higbee's (1966-1992) became Dillard's

JCPenney (1966-2019)

Sears (1967-2017)

Woolworths (1966-1994)

May Company Ohio (1990-1993)

Kaufmann's (1993-2006)

Macy's (2006-2016)

Steve & Barry's (2004 to 2008)

Dillard's (1992-2007)

Johnny K's Powersports (2018-present)

Dunham's Sports (2013-present)

Best Buy (1995-2020)

External links
 Midway Mall official website
 Centro Properties https://www.midwaymallshopping.com/directory/

References

Shopping malls in Ohio
Elyria, Ohio
Shopping malls established in 1965
Buildings and structures in Lorain County, Ohio
Tourist attractions in Lorain County, Ohio
1965 establishments in Ohio
Namdar Realty Group